Edward E. Palmer was the first president of the SUNY College of Environmental Science and Forestry and held that position from 1969 to 1983.

Education
Palmer received his bachelor's degree from Middlebury College in Vermont, and his Doctorate from Syracuse  University. He also received an honorary degree in law from Syracuse University. Although he never had any formal training in forestry, Dr. Palmer had a tree farm between Fabius, New York and Cuyler, New York that he bought in 1951 while he was still on the faculty of the Maxwell School at Syracuse University.

Career
Before joining the SUNY College of Environmental Science and Forestry in 1969, Palmer directed SUNY's Overseas Academics Programs and spent nearly 30 years on the faculty of Syracuse University's Maxwell School of Citizenship and Public Affairs. In 1969 Dr. Palmer became the first president of the SUNY College of Environmental Science and Forestry and held this position until 1983. 

Palmer brought several changes when he became president of the SUNY College of Environmental Science and Forestry. Before Palmer,
all the head administrators at the college were deans. Palmer was the college's first president. He changed the school's name from the State University College of Forestry at Syracuse University to the College of Environmental Science and Forestry.

References

External links 
 The Archives from Edward Palmer's tenure as president of the New York State College of Forestry are located in the Archives of the SUNY College of Environmental Sciences and Forestry 
 Hugh Canham SUNY-ESF: 100 YEARS AND STILL GOING STRONG 1911-2011

State University of New York College of Environmental Science and Forestry faculty
Leaders of the State University of New York College of Environmental Science and Forestry
Middlebury College alumni
Syracuse University alumni
Syracuse University faculty
Year of birth missing
Place of birth missing
Year of death missing
Place of death missing